Vollidiot is a 2007 German comedy film based on the eponymous novel by Tommy Jaud.

Cast 
 Oliver Pocher – Simon Peters
 Oliver Fleischer – Flik
 Tanja Wenzel – Paula
 Tomas Spencer – Steve
 Anke Engelke – Eule
 Adriana Altaras – Lala
  - Marcia
 Carolin Kebekus: Marcia's friend
 Friederike Kempter – Tina
  - Dörte
 Julia Stinshoff – Katja
 Jana Pallaske – Petra
  - Daniela
  - Julian
  - Policeman Malte

External links 

2007 comedy films
2007 films
German comedy films
Films based on German novels
2000s German films
2000s German-language films